Twelve Corners is an unincorporated community in the town of Center in Outagamie County, Wisconsin, United States.

Geography
Twelve Corners is located at  (44.401944, -88.435).

Transportation

References

External links
 Hometown Locator-Twelve Corners

Unincorporated communities in Outagamie County, Wisconsin
Unincorporated communities in Wisconsin